Nivedita Bhattacharya (born 21 July 1970) is an Indian actress. She was born in Lucknow.

She is an actress who has acted on television and in films.

Filmography

 Kya Kehna (2000) - Preity Zinta's sister-in-law
 Darr @ the Mall (2014) - Tisha
 Phobia (2016) - Anusha
 Aiyaary (2018) - News reporter
 Chicken Curry Law (2019) - Satya Deshmukh
 Shaadistan (2021) - Arshi's mother

Television

References

External links

Living people
1970 births
Indian television actresses
Actresses from Lucknow
Bengali Hindus
Indian soap opera actresses
Indian stage actresses